KAAF University College is an engineering, business administration, law and nursing college in Budumburam, Gomoa East District, Ghana.

Background
KAAF University College is the first private university in Ghana accredited by the National Accreditation Board to run degree programmes in: Civil Engineering Construction Technology and Geomatic (Geodetic) Engineering and BSc. Mechanical Engineering. It was founded by Michael Aidoo.

At its 20th meeting held on 13 September 2007, the Accreditation Committee of the National Accreditation Board decided to grant three years' authorization to the KAAF University College, Gomoa with effect from September 1, 2007, to commence and, or continue its preparation for accreditation of the institution. It is affiliated to the Kwame Nkrumah University of Science and Technology (KNUST) and the main campus is at Buduburam.

There are also programmes leading to the award of Bachelor of Science (BSc) degree in Business Administration with options in Banking and Finance, Accounting, Human Resource Management, Insurance, Marketing and Entrepreneurship.

Program
The programs offered by the college fall under Four main faculties: Engineering, Business Administration, Health Science and Law.

Faculty of Engineering
 Bsc. Construction Technology
 Bsc. Mechanical Engineering
 Bsc. Electrical / Electronics Engineering
 Bsc. Civil Engineering
 Bsc. Geomatic Engineering
Bsc. Computer Science

Faculty of Business Administration
 Accounting
 Banking & Finance
 Human Resource Management
 Marketing

Faculty of Law
Bachelor Of Laws (LL.B) Program: 
 4 - Year LL.B Program  
 3 - Year LL.B Program

Health and Allied Science
 Bsc. Nursing
Bsc. Midwifery
Bsc. Public Health Nursing
Bsc. Physician Assistant Studies
Bsc. Medical Laboratory Science

Affiliations
KAAF University College runs its programs in affiliation to:
 GIMPA
 University for Development Studies
 Kwame Nkrumah University of Science and Technology

See also
 Kwame Nkrumah University of Science and Technology
 National Accreditation Board
 Education in Ghana

External links
 Official website
 Ghana University Courses

References

Universities in Ghana
Scientific organisations based in Ghana
Central Region (Ghana)